GGV may refer to:

 Gabriel González Videla (1898–1980), Chilean politician
 Gargrave railway station, in England
 Gandang Gabi, Vice!, a Filipino comedy talk show
 GGV Capital, an American venture capital firm
 Guru Ghasidas Vishwavidyalaya, a university in Chhattisgarh, India
 Kwigillingok Airport, in Alaska